The National Economic and Social Council (NESC) (Irish An Chomhairle Náisiúnta Eacnamaíoch Shóisialta) is an independent body that advises the Taoiseach (Irish Prime Minister) on areas of policy relating to social and economic development. It was part of the Social Partnership model that became part of Irish politics before the Celtic Tiger years. Its findings can hold a considerable amount of information about problems in existing public sector operations, such as how unemployed people are incentivized to remain unemployed, but these findings are not always acted upon.

Current work
The council is currently working on three projects:

Unemployment and Active Labour Market Policies, 2011-2015
The Role of Standards in the Provision of Quality Human Services
Ireland’s Economic Recovery: Recognising Performance – Finding Shared Goals

References

External links
 NESC website

Politics of the Republic of Ireland